Waiting for Sheila is a 1976 novel by the British writer John Braine.

Julian Barnes wrote a scathing review of the novel in the New Statesman, leading Braine to respond in a letter in which he attacked Barnes saying "I'm not going to be reproved for materialism by a thoroughgoing middle-class materialist".

References

Bibliography
 Vanessa Guignery. Julian Barnes from the Margins: Exploring the Writer's Archives. Bloomsbury Publishing, 5 Mar 2020.

1976 British novels
Novels by John Braine
Methuen Publishing books